Clavus cadenasi, common name Cadena's turrid, is a species of sea snail, a marine gastropod mollusk in the family Drilliidae.

Description
The shell grows to a length of 40 mm.

Distribution
This species occurs in the Caribbean Sea off Cuba.

References

 Clench, W. J. and C. G. Aguayo. 1939. Notes and descriptions of new deep-water Mollusca obtained by the Harvard-Havana Expedition off the coast of Cuba. II Memorias de la Sociedad Cubana de Historia Natural "Felipe Poey" 13 189–197, pls. 28–29.

External links

cadenasi
Gastropods described in 1939